The Beguiled is a 2017 American Southern Gothic thriller film written and directed by Sofia Coppola, based on the 1966 novel of the same name (originally published as A Painted Devil) by Thomas P. Cullinan. It stars Colin Farrell, Nicole Kidman, Kirsten Dunst, and Elle Fanning. It is the second film adaptation of Cullinan's novel, following Don Siegel's 1971 film of the same name.

It premiered on May 24 at the 2017 Cannes Film Festival, and was selected to compete for the Palme d'Or in its main competition section, where Coppola won the Best Director award, becoming only the second woman (after 1961 winner Yuliya Solntseva) to do so. The film was released theatrically on June 23, 2017, by Focus Features.

Plot
Martha Farnsworth runs a girls school in Virginia during the Civil War. By 1864, almost all of the students, teachers, and slaves have left. In addition to Farnsworth herself, only five students and one teacher, Edwina Morrow, remain. While out in the woods searching for mushrooms, Amy, a pupil, comes across John McBurney, a corporal in the Union Army who was wounded in the leg during battle, and has since deserted. Amy brings McBurney to the school where he falls unconscious. The women lock McBurney in one of the rooms while Miss Farnsworth tends to his wounds. All the women and girls in the school are immediately fascinated by the handsome man.

Initially, some of the school's residents want McBurney to be delivered as a prisoner of war to the Confederate Army, but Miss Farnsworth decides that they will let his leg heal before they decide what they will do with him. When Confederate soldiers arrive at the school, Miss Farnsworth does not tell them that a Union soldier is on the premises. While McBurney is recovering, the women and girls subtly vie for his affection by giving him presents, wearing jewelry, and preparing a lavish dinner for him. He returns the affection, concentrating especially on Miss Morrow and Miss Farnsworth. When he is able to move again, he begins to help in the garden. It becomes clear that he fears returning to battle.

When Miss Farnsworth indicates that McBurney is healthy enough and will have to leave the school in a few days, he tries to convince her to let him stay as a gardener, and tells Miss Morrow that he has fallen in love with her. One night, he tells Miss Morrow to await him in her room. When he does not appear and she hears strange noises, she investigates and finds him in bed with Alicia, a teenage pupil. McBurney tries to calm the angry Miss Morrow down, but she pushes him away, causing him to fall down the stairs, badly break his already injured leg and fall unconscious. Miss Farnsworth decides that the only way to save his life is to amputate the leg.

When he awakes the next day and realizes he has lost his leg, McBurney is devastated and furious, accusing the women (and especially Miss Farnsworth) of having punished him for choosing Alicia's room instead of theirs. He is locked up in his room but threatens Alicia, who gets him the room key. He then breaks out, steals a gun, and loudly threatens the women before storming off. Miss Morrow follows him to his room, where she initiates a sexual encounter.

Meanwhile Miss Farnsworth tries to find a solution. One of the students suggests killing McBurney by preparing him a dinner of poisonous mushrooms, to which Miss Farnsworth agrees. During the dinner, Miss Morrow, unaware of the plan, is deterred by the others at the last minute from putting the mushrooms on her own plate, but McBurney's suspicions are not aroused. Promptly after eating the mushrooms, he falls to the floor in the throes of death. While the others are sewing McBurney's body into a shroud, Miss Morrow looks on, devastated. The film ends with the women dragging McBurney's body to the road so that he will be found by the next Confederate soldiers who pass by.

Cast
 

 Nicole Kidman as Miss Martha Farnsworth
 Colin Farrell as Corporal John McBurney
 Kirsten Dunst as Miss Edwina Morrow
 Elle Fanning as Alicia
 Oona Laurence as Amy
 Angourie Rice as Jane
 Addison Riecke as Marie
 Emma Howard as Emily
 Wayne Pere as The Captain
 Matt Story as Confederate Soldier
 Joel Albin as Cavalry Man

Production
The film is based on the 1966 book of the same name by author Thomas P. Cullinan about a wounded Union soldier in a Mississippi seminary during the American Civil War, and was made for under $10 million. The film exhibited elements of the thriller genre, a departure for Coppola.

Coppola had initially expressed an aversion to a remake, but after watching the 1971 version at the urging of production designer Anne Ross, she was left contemplating ways she could update the film. Specifically, she became interested in showing the story from the women's point of view, as opposed to the man's. The material came to Coppola at a time when she wanted to make a more optimistic film than 2013's The Bling Ring, stating that she wanted to "cleanse myself" from what she terms was "such a tacky, ugly world". Coppola cited her fascination with the South as part of the story's attraction. Coppola has said that she "wanted the film to represent an exaggerated version of all the ways women were traditionally raised there just to be lovely and cater to men—the manners of that whole world, and how they change when the men go away". Coppola has cited Gone with the Wind as her inspiration for creating a film that was relatable despite its position within a different era.

In March 2016, it was announced that Elle Fanning, Nicole Kidman, and Kirsten Dunst were in talks to appear in the film, and had been signed by July, when Colin Farrell entered talks. Based on a Magnificat from Monteverdi's Vespro della Beata Vergine, the music for the film was composed by the rock band Phoenix (whose lead singer, Thomas Mars, is married to Coppola). Two popular Civil War ballads, "Lorena" and "Aura Lea", were used in the film, in addition to Stephen Foster's "Virginia Belle". Most of the costumes in the film were designed by Stacey Battat, who used the costume and fabric archives of the Metropolitan Museum of Art to gain inspiration for contemporary fashion. Corsets were made for each actress, while for historical accuracy only cotton fabric was used, which was in turn either stone washed or enzyme washed to weather the fabrics and make them look worn in.

Principal photography began on October 31, 2016, and concluded on December 7, 2016. Exterior scenes were shot on the grounds of the Madewood Plantation House, near Napoleonville, Louisiana. Interiors were filmed in actress Jennifer Coolidge's house in New Orleans.

Release
The film had its world premiere at the 2017 Cannes Film Festival; Coppola won the Best Director Award, making her the second woman to ever win in that category, 56 years after the first female director won. The film began a limited release on June 23, 2017, before expanding to a wide release on June 30, 2017.

Reception

Box office
The Beguiled grossed $10.6 million in the United States and Canada and $16.1 million in other territories for a total of $26.7 million.

In the film's limited opening weekend, it made $240,545 from four theaters (a per-theater gross of $60,136), finishing 20th at the box office. In its wide opening, it made $3.2 million from 674 theaters (an average of $4,694), finishing 8th at the box office.

Critical response
On review aggregator website Rotten Tomatoes, the film has an approval rating of 78% based on 330 reviews, with an average rating of 7.2/10. The website's critical consensus reads, "The Beguiled adds just enough extra depth to its source material to set itself apart, and director Sofia Coppola's restrained touch is enlivened by strong performances from the cast." On Metacritic, the film has a score of 77 out of 100, based on 45 critics, indicating "generally favorable reviews".

David Ehrlich of IndieWire gave the film an "A−", saying, "Coppola's film is told with surgical precision and savage grace." Todd McCarthy of The Hollywood Reporter stated: "Other than to place slightly more emphasis on the female empowerment angle ... it's hard to detect a strong raison d'etre behind Sofia Coppola's slow-to-develop melodrama."

Controversy
The film faced a wave of controversy and division, including accusations of 'whitewashing' the original story after she chose to both remove the supporting role of a black female slave from the film, as well as to choose Kirsten Dunst to portray a character who was biracial in the original novel. Coppola also faced criticism for minimizing the story of the people experiencing actual hardship in favor of depicting, albeit authentically, the lavish lifestyle of her protagonists, thus minimizing the importance of a weighty topic, which was not the first time one of Coppola's films was said to expose the sociocultural affordances of her own childhood. Coppola responded to these allegations by stating that she made the changes so as "not [to] brush over such an important topic in a light way," and that "[y]oung girls watch my films and this was not the depiction of an African American character I would want to show them." She furthermore cited the presence of young girls among her moviegoing audience, and described her version of the film as a reinterpretation, rather than a remake, of Don Siegel's 1971 adaption of the same book. Coppola wanted to tell the story of the male soldier entering into a classically southern and female environment from the point of view of the women in order to represent that experience. Coppola thought that the earlier version made the characters out to be unrealistic caricatures, which did not allow the viewer to connect with them.

While some critics stated that Coppola intended The Beguiled as a feminist work, Coppola has explained that she was not in favor of that labeling. Though she has said she is happy if others see the film in this way, she sees it as a film, rather, that possesses a female perspective—an important distinction. The Beguiled was also made as a contrast to The Bling Ring, and Coppola has explained the need to correct that film's harsh Los Angeles aesthetic with something more beautiful and poetic.

Accolades

See also 
 The Beguiled (1971 film)

References

External links
 
 
 
 
 

2017 films
2010s feminist films
2017 thriller drama films
American Civil War films
American thriller drama films
Remakes of American films
American Zoetrope films
Focus Features films
Films about amputees
Films set in the 1860s
Films set in 1864
Films set in Richmond, Virginia
Films set in Virginia
Films based on American novels
Films directed by Sofia Coppola
Films with screenplays by Sofia Coppola
Murder in films
Poisoning in film
Southern Gothic films
2017 drama films
Films shot in Louisiana
Films shot in New Orleans
2010s English-language films
2010s American films
Race-related controversies in film
Casting controversies in film